Corruptly obstructing, influencing, or impeding an official proceeding is a felony under U.S. federal law. It was enacted as part of the Sarbanes–Oxley Act of 2002 as a reaction to the Enron scandal, and closed a legal loophole on who could be charged with evidence tampering by defining the new crime very broadly. It later became known for its use as a charge against defendants associated with the 2021 U.S. Capitol attack for attempting to obstruct that year's Electoral College vote count.

Legal basis 
The relevant subsection reads:

History

Enactment 

The provision was enacted by Section 1102 of the Sarbanes–Oxley Act of 2002 as a reaction to the Enron scandal, where Enron's auditor Arthur Andersen had destroyed potentially incriminating documents. It added a new subsection to the Victim and Witness Protection Act of 1982, which had already defined the term "official proceeding" and used it in describing other crimes. In a signing statement, President George W. Bush stated that the term "corruptly" would be construed as requiring proof of a criminal state of mind, in order to avoid infringing on the constitutional right to petition.

Prior to the Sarbanes–Oxley Act, anyone who corruptly persuaded others to destroy, alter, or conceal evidence could be prosecuted, but the individuals actually performing the act, or individuals acting alone, could not be prosecuted. The new provision closed this loophole by defining the new crime very broadly. The case Arthur Andersen LLP v. United States, which was prosecuted under an older subsection of the law, resulted in Arthur Andersen's conviction being overturned by the Supreme Court in 2005 because flawed jury instructions did not account for that subsection's requirement that the action be taken not only "corruptly" but "knowingly".

Use prior to 2021 
In the 2010s, some examples of convictions for obstructing an official proceeding included an associate of the Colombo crime family who obstructed a grand jury investigation, a teacher who tipped off drug dealers that they were under investigation using information from a relative who was a detective, and a former tour bus company executive who concealed and instructed subordinates to destroy documents sought in a federal antitrust investigation.

In 2019, Roger Stone was convicted of obstructing an official proceeding as part of the Mueller Special Counsel investigation, for lying to the U.S. House Committee on Intelligence and encouraging another witness to lie for him. Stone was later pardoned by President Donald Trump.

Obstructing an official proceeding is one of the charges in United States v. Joseph, a 2019 case where a Massachusetts state court judge and court officer helped a state court defendant evade a U.S. Immigration and Customs Enforcement agent by allowing the defendant to leave a court hearing through a rear door of the courthouse.

2021 U.S. Capitol attack 

As of December 2022, about 290 out of over 910 defendants associated with the 2021 U.S. Capitol attack had been charged with obstructing an official proceeding, with over 70 convicted. It tended to be used with defendants who had entered the Senate chamber or the offices of Congress members, or members of groups such as the Oath Keepers, Proud Boys, and Three Percenters who were alleged to have prepared for violence in advance. Those who entered other areas of the Capitol were typically charged only with misdemeanors such as entering a restricted federal building, or parading, demonstrating, or picketing in the Capitol. For those charged with a felony, prosecutors preferred an obstructing an official proceeding charge in most cases, rather than insurrection or seditious conspiracy charges which are harder to prove and were considered to have more potential to be politically incendiary.

Those who have pleaded guilty to obstructing an official proceeding include "QAnon Shaman" Jacob Chansley, Olympic medalist Klete Keller, and musician Jon Schaffer.  On March 8, 2022, in the first criminal trial of a Capitol attack defendant, Guy Reffitt became the first to be convicted of obstructing an official proceeding, along with other charges.  In November 2022, Stewart Rhodes and four other members of the Oath Keepers were convicted of obstructing an official proceeding along with other crimes.  Four additional Oath Keepers members were convicted in January 2023, as was Richard Barnett, who had been prominently photographed in Speaker Nancy Pelosi's office during the attack.

Applicability dispute 
Some defendants argued that, given the circumstances of its passage, the law should apply only to proceedings involving the administration of justice where evidence is being presented, and not the Electoral College vote count as an administrative and ceremonial event.  Although two federal judges of the District Court for the District of Columbia initially expressed concerns in court about the law's use, by March 2022, they and eight other federal judges had rejected challenges to the obstruction charge, finding that the law had been properly invoked and was not unconstitutionally vague.

However, on March 7, Carl J. Nichols became the first federal judge to rule that the law was not applicable to the Capitol attack, on the basis that the word "otherwise" in the statute required that the conduct must involve "some action with respect to a document, record, or other object".  At least two other district court judges subsequently criticized Nichols' reading of the statute in their own rulings, and in August 2022, Nichols' rulings on three such defendants was appealed to the Court of Appeals for the District of Columbia Circuit.  The hearing occurred on December 12, 2022.

References 

Crimes in the United States
Corruption in the United States
United States federal obstruction of justice law